The Nomads Motorcycle Club is an outlaw motorcycle club in Australia with a large number of chapters and members nationwide. It was founded in Newcastle in 1968.
A number of countries have motorcycle clubs called "Nomads Motorcycle Club", e.g. Australia, South Africa and Germany, and there is a Nomads gang in New Zealand.

History 
Nomads MC was founded in Newcastle , Australia, 1968. Since then the club has expanded to all states and territories across the country.

Patch / motto / colors 
The Nomads patch consists of a skull wearing a helmet. The helmet has wings and a swastika. Behind the helmet are a set of pistons. A small set of wings are also seen beside the "NOMADS" text.

The Nomads colors are black and white.

#14

Chapters 
The club has chapters throughout Australia, but none in other countries.

Rough geographical locations of the chapters are as follows:

 Nomads Adelaide chapter
 Nomads Newcastle chapter
 Nomads Parramatta, New South Wales / Girraween, New South Wales / Wetherill Park, New South Wales chapter (Western Sydney)
 Nomads Sydney / Marrickville, New South Wales chapter
North coast Byron Bay, New South Wales chapter
Blacktown, New South Wales chapter
Victoria chapter
Gold Coast chapter
Brisbane chapter  
Hobart chapter 
Launceston  chapter 
Perth chapter

Well-known members 

John Thomas Browne – First Nomads National President

“Metho” Tom Browne - a well known member of the Sydney chapter, Tom was a respected figure among the outlaw clubs of the city. 

Tom went on to become President of the Sydney chapter, then ultimately became the first National President.

Tom owned Blacktown Harley Davidson, which was targeted with a firebombing during a dispute with the Rebels MC in 2005, the estimations of the cost of damage are around the $1 million mark.

Metho Tom was diagnosed with cancer in 2007 and died later in April 2008, members of The Bandidos, The Lone Wolves, Highway 61, The Hells Angels, the Black Uhlans, the Gladiators and even The Comancheros and The Rebels came together to bid farewell to Tom Browne, with 1000 bikies that rumbled through the streets of western Sydney, it was one of Australia's largest bikie funerals.

He was "Metho Tom" to most, "The King of Blacktown" to many.

Scott Orrock – Nomads National President / Hells Angels

Scott Orrock was the Nomads National President and had been involved in several high profile events including the shooting at the Nomads Newcastle clubhouse in September 2004 (see "Crime / In The Media" section below for more information).

He has owned multiple tattoo shops including "Skin Deep Tattoo" in Newtown, New South Wales.

In December 2009, Scott Orrock patched over to the Hells Angels, bringing with him several members of the Nomads. This move was one of the reasons for the escalating violence between the Nomads and Hells Angels over the coming months, including his vehicle being torched the following day.

Crimes and events 
2004 – 12 September 2004. Parramatta Member Sam Ibrahim, National President Scott Allan Orrock and Paul James Griffin travel to the Nomads Newcastle clubhouse for a meeting accompanied by approximately 40 other members. A fight broke out at the clubhouse, with Newcastle Sgt-At-Arms, Dale Campton, being shot in both knees by Ibrahim. Newcastle chapter member Mark Chrystie was also shot in both legs. A third Newcastle member had his Nomads jacket and ring taken, before being bashed. In May 2006, Campton became a police informer and provided details of the crime.

2006 – May 2006. Newcastle Sergeant at Arms, Dale Campton, becomes a police informer, providing them details of the fight with the Parramatta chapter on 12 September 2004.

2006 – December 2006. Ibrahim, Orrock and Griffin are arrested for the 12 September 2004 attack on the Newcastle members. As part of Ibrahim's arrest his unit in Parramatta is raided by police. In the raid police uncover weapons, ammunition, a bullet proof vest, walking stick sword and nunchucks, leading him to also be charged for 11 weapons and property offences.

2007 – April 2007. The "Skin Deep Tattoo" store in Newtown, Sydney, which is owned by Orrock, is shot up.

2008 – October 2008. Ibrahim, Orrock and Griffin are acquitted of the 2004 attack at the Newcastle clubhouse.

2009 – 27 February 2009. 14 Nomads are inside the Sydney chapter clubhouse in Marrickville when gunmen wearing balaclavas enter. Three Nomads are shot in the legs and lower torso before the gunmen leave the building.

2009 – 3 December 2009. A Toyota Soarer vehicle owned by former President Scott Orrock is torched. This attack comes the day after he patches in to the Hells Angels Motorcycle Club.

2015 – 30 January 2015. 13 members of the Nomads are arrested following a raid on their clubhouse in Wetherill Park, Sydney. Most of those arrested were charged under recently brought in legislation making it illegal to consort with convicted offenders. The Wetherill Park clubhouse was shut down as part of the raids.

2015 – May 2015. 12 people associated with the Nomads, including 2 high ranking members, are arrested in raids across New South Wales and Adelaide. The group includes mainly members of the Adelaide chapter. Charges against the 12 people include soliciting to murder, kidnapping, blackmail and assault. Included in those arrested were the Adelaide chapter President, Adelaide Sgt-At-Arms and the New South Wales Vice President. Police advise that the crimes "were committed as a result of the victims not undertaking the required acts set out by the Nomads" and that the victims were either Nomads members or associates.

Books / movies / TV 
While there are no books specific to the Nomads Motorcycle Club, multiple books detail the events that they have been involved in.

Nomads Book – Gangland Sydney by James Morton and Susanna Lobez. Find out more on Amazon (link opens in a new tab).

Nomads Book – Biker Gangs and Transnational Organized Crime by Thomas Barker. Find out more on Amazon (link opens in a new tab).

Enemies and allies 
Nomads MC enemies:

 Rebels MC (Australia) are enemies.
 Finks Motorcycle Club, Australia.

Nomads MC allies:
 Hells angels

See also

Criminal Law (Criminal Organisations Disruption) Amendment Act 2013
List of outlaw motorcycle clubs
Nomad (motorcycle club membership)

References

External links

Outlaw motorcycle clubs
Gangs in Australia
Motorcycle clubs in Australia
1980 establishments in Australia
Organizations established in 1980
Organisations based in Sydney